Sherman Village is a neighborhood in the San Fernando Valley region of Los Angeles, California.

References

Communities in the San Fernando Valley
Neighborhoods in Los Angeles
Populated places in the Santa Monica Mountains